Henri Crémieux (19 July 1896 – 10 May 1980) was a French actor. He appeared in more than a hundred films between 1930 and 1980.

Selected filmography

External links 
 

1896 births
1980 deaths
Male actors from Marseille
French male film actors
20th-century French male actors